Armand Gregg (1820–1897) was a German-born journalist with democratic beliefs.  He was a member of the Baden Provisional Government in 1849.  He was also of the First International and a member of the German Social Democratic Party in the 1870s.

References

1820 births
1897 deaths
German revolutionaries
Social Democratic Party of Germany politicians
German male writers